Shawn Adewoye (born 29 June 2000) is a Belgian professional footballer who plays as a centre-back for Waalwijk.

Club career
Adewoye is a youth product of the academies of KESK Leopoldsburg and Genk. Beginning his senior career with the reserves of Genk, he transferred to the Dutch club Waalwijk on 31 January 2021. He made his professional debut with Waalwijk in a 2–0 Eredivisie loss to Sparta Rotterdam on 13 March 2021.

International career
Adewoye was born in Belgium to a Nigerian father, and a Belgian mother of Italian descent. He is a youth international for Belgium, having represented the Belgium U15s, U16s, Belgium U17s, Belgium U18s, and U19s.

References

External links
 
 
 
 Eredivisie profile

2000 births
Living people
People from Bree, Belgium
Belgian people of Nigerian descent
Belgian people of Italian descent
Belgian footballers
Footballers from Limburg (Belgium)
Association football defenders
Belgium youth international footballers
K.R.C. Genk players
RKC Waalwijk players
Eredivisie players
Belgian expatriate footballers
Belgian expatriate sportspeople in the Netherlands
Expatriate footballers in the Netherlands